The U20 men's race at the 2023 World Athletics Cross Country Championships was held at the Bathurst in Australia, on February 18, 2023. Ishmael Kipkurui from Kenya won the gold medal by 1 second over Kenyan Reynold Kipkorir Cheruiyot, while Boki Diriba finished third.

Race results

U20 men's race (8 km)

Individual

Team

References

World Athletics Cross Country Championships